Stuart Pearson Wright (born 1975, Northampton) is an English portrait artist, winner of the BP Portrait Award.

Life and works
Wright went to school in Eastbourne, Sussex and graduated from Slade School of Fine Art, University College of London (1995–1999), receiving a B.A. in Fine Art.

He won the BP Travel Prize in 1998. When he was 25 the National Portrait Gallery acquired his painting of the actor John Hurt.

In 2001 he won the BP Portrait Award with his painting of six presidents of the National Academy. It was described as "astounding", showing the men surrounding a dead chicken. As part of his prize he was commissioned to paint author J K Rowling and that painting is part of the National Collection.

Wright won the Garrick/Milne Prize in 2005. An exhibition of his work entitled Halfboy was on show at The Heong Gallery of Downing College, Cambridge from 2 November 2018 to 6 February 2019.
He is an extraordinary artist and has created magnificent paintings so far in his life. his exceptional use of oil paint creates an amazing realistic  tone to his work.

Personal life
Pearson-Wright was conceived by artificial insemination, and does not know his father.

He is married to Polly and has a son, named Wulfred.

References

External links
Home page
Paintings at the National Portrait Gallery

20th-century English painters
English male painters
21st-century English painters
English portrait painters
1975 births
Living people
Alumni of the Slade School of Fine Art
BP Portrait Award winners
English contemporary artists
People educated at East Sussex College
20th-century English male artists
21st-century English male artists